Panther tree iguana is a common name for two species of iguana:

 Liolaemus islugensis
 Liolaemus pantherinus